The 1956 Colgate Red Raiders football team was an American football team that represented Colgate University as an independent during the 1956 NCAA University Division football season. In its fifth season under head coach Hal Lahar, the team compiled a 4–5 record. James Yurak was the team captain. 

The team played its home games at Colgate Athletic Field in Hamilton, New York.

Schedule

Leading players
Statistical leaders for the 1956 Red Raiders included: 
 Rushing: John Call, 479 yards and 11 touchdowns on 82 attempts
 Passing: Guy Martin, 1,100 yards, 88 completions and 9 touchdowns on 170 attempts
 Receiving: Alfred Jamison, 289 yards and 6 touchdowns on 29 receptions
 Scoring: John Call, 66 points from 11 touchdowns
 All-purpose yards: John Call, 1,000 yards (479 rushing, 236 kickoff returning, 231 receiving, 53 punt returning, 1 interception returning)

References

Colgate
Colgate Raiders football seasons
Colgate Red Raiders football